The girls handball tournament at the 2014 Summer Youth Olympics in Nanjing was held from 20 to 25 August. Games were played at the Jiangning Sports Center Gymnasium. 

South Korea won their first title after defeating Russia 32-31 in the final. Sweden captured the bronze, by winning against Brazil 23-16.

Competition schedule

Qualification

Competition format
The six teams in the tournament were divided into two groups of three, with each team initially playing round-robin games within their group. Following the completion of the round-robin stage, the top two teams from each group advance to the semi-finals. The two semi-final winners meet for the gold medal match, while the semi-final losers play in the bronze medal match.

Rosters

Preliminary round

Group A

Group B

Knockout stage

Fifth place game

Angola win 53-40 on aggregate

Semifinals

Bronze medal game

Gold medal game

Final ranking

References

Handball at the 2014 Summer Youth Olympics